Mark William Seymour (1897 – 16 September 1952) was an English professional golfer. His birth was registered as William Mark Seymour. He was a half-brother of Abe Mitchell. Although not as successful as his half-brother, he enjoyed considerable success during his time in Scotland and twice played for England against Scotland. In important tournaments he was a runner-up in the 1931 Irish Open and a losing finalist in the 1931 and 1933 News of the World Match Play.

Early life
Seymour was born in East Grinstead, Sussex in 1897. He was the son of Mark and Mary Seymour. Mary had an illegitimate son, Abe Mitchell, Mark's half-brother, who was also a successful professional golfer. He played left-handed until he was 11 but changed to play right-handed because the clubs were easier to find. He won the 1921 Golf Illustrated Gold Vase and turned professional later the same year.

Golf career
After World War I, Seymour had played his golf as a North Foreland Golf Club amateur and took his first professional position at Rochester and Cobham Golf Club in early 1922. In 1924 he moved to St Leonards-on-Sea where he stayed until resigning in 1931. He was unattached for a short period and moved to Scotland, joining Crow Wood Golf Club, Glasgow in 1932. He moved to Bonnyton Moor Golf Club in early 1936 before leaving in 1937 to be work in a shop, teaching and selling golfing equipment. In 1942 Seymour became the professional at North Shore Golf Club in Skegness.

Death and legacy
Seymour died in his shop at the North Shore Golf Club in Skegness, England on 16 September 1952 at the age 55. His son Mark Donald Seymour was also a professional golfer.

Amateur wins
1921 Golf Illustrated Gold Vase

Professional wins
1930 Roehampton Invitation Tournament
1931 Scottish Professional Championship
1932 Roehampton Invitation Tournament
1933 Scottish Professional Championship
1934 Scottish Professional Championship, Dunlop-Scottish Tournament
1935 Dunlop-Scottish Tournament, Czechoslovak Open
1936 Czechoslovak Open

Results in major championships

Note: Seymour only played in The Open Championship and The Amateur Championship.

CUT = missed the half-way cut
R256, R128 = Round in which player lost in match play
"T" indicates a tie for a place

Team appearances
England–Scotland Professional Match (representing England): 1932 (winners), 1933 (winners)
England–Ireland Professional Match (representing England): 1932 (winners), 1933 (winners)
Ireland–Scotland Professional Match (representing Scotland): 1932

References

English male golfers
People from East Grinstead
People from Skegness
1897 births
1952 deaths